The 2016 USA Rugby League season was the sixth season of the USA Rugby League National Premiership competition, and its second as the undisputed top-level rugby league competition in the United States. Fourteen teams competed for the National Championship.  The season began on Saturday, June 4, and concluded with the Championship Final on Saturday, August 27, in Boston.  The Philadelphia Fight won their fourth USARL Championship, defeating the Jacksonville Axemen 42-20.

Teams
The Connecticut Wildcats folded after the 2015 season, and were replaced by the White Plains Wombats

Regular season

Teams in the South Conference played 6 games on a double round-robin schedule.  Teams in the North Conference played 8 games, primarily within their own division.  A win was worth 2 points, a draw worth 1 point, and a loss worth 0 points.  There were no bonus points for number of tries or close losses.

Final regular-season standings.

Week 1

Week 2

Week 3

Week 4

Week 5

Week 6

Week 7

Week 8

Playoffs

In the South Conference, the teams with the best and worst records, and the second- and third-best records, played each other in the South Conference Semi-Finals. The winners met in the South Conference Final. In the North Conference, the teams with the second-and third-best records in each division played each other in the North Conference Division Semi-Finals. The winners played the teams with the best records in their respective divisions in the North Conference Divisional Finals. The Winners of the Divisional Finals played in the North Conference Final. The winners of the Conference Finals met in the Championship Final.

Round 1

Round 2

Conference finals

Championship final

All-Star Game

After the conclusion of the 2016 season, the USARL held the first annual All-Star Game, with two teams made up of the best players from each conference.

References

2016 in American rugby league
USA Rugby League